Jay Robinson (April 14, 1930 – September 27, 2013) was an American actor specializing in character roles. He achieved his greatest fame playing Emperor Caligula in the film The Robe (1953) and its sequel Demetrius and the Gladiators (1954), and years later portraying the boss of the character played by Warren Beatty in Shampoo (1975).

Early life
Robinson was born in New York City. His mother was a dancer; his father was a director of the Van Heusen Shirt Company.  He became interested in acting after discovering a scrapbook of his mother's dance career.

Career
Robinson began his acting career in summer stock theatre and repertory companies, and eventually made his way to the Broadway stage, where he appeared in Shakespeare's As You Like It and Much Ado About Nothing, as well as several other plays by the age of 19. His first film role was as the notorious Emperor Caligula in The Robe (1953), which he reprised in his second film, that movie's sequel Demetrius and the Gladiators (1954).

This was followed by roles in a variety of films, including The Virgin Queen (1955) starring Bette Davis, My Man Godfrey (1957) with David Niven and June Allyson, Woody Allen's comedy Everything You Always Wanted to Know About Sex* (*But Were Afraid to Ask) (1972), and Bram Stoker's Dracula (1992). He also was featured on two Folkways albums of Shakespeare: Othello: William Shakespeare and William Shakespeare: King Richard III, both released in 1964.

Robinson's many television guest spots included Star Trek: The Original Series ("Elaan of Troyius"), The Wild Wild West (Dr. Maitland in "The Night of the Sedgewick Curse"), Planet of the Apes and the title role in the 16 episodes of Sid & Marty Krofft's Dr. Shrinker, prominently featured on The Krofft Supershow. He appeared in two episodes of the situation comedy Bewitched, as Julius Caesar (1969) and as Tabitha's tutor, Professor Poindexter Phipps (1970). He appeared as different characters on five episodes of Mannix  between 1968 and 1974, in three episodes of The Waltons (1975–76), and two episodes of Barney Miller, "The Sniper" (1976) and "The Tontine" (1982). He guest-starred as Cassius Thorne in the Buck Rogers in the 25th Century episode "Planet of the Amazon Women" (1979), and on an episode of Tales of the Gold Monkey as the governor in "Last Chance Louie" (1983). He appeared in two episodes of Murder, She Wrote (1987 and 1991), and on Cheers in 1989.  Robinson was a regular on the daytime soap opera Days of Our Lives from 1988-1989, playing the role of Monty Dolan.

For the cinema, he played the role of Monroe Feather in the blaxploitation movie Three the Hard Way (1974) starring Jim Brown, Jim Kelly and Fred Williamson. The character Feather was recreated in the movie Undercover Brother. He also appeared in Born Again (1978), the film adaptation of the book of the same title, about Watergate figure, Charles W. Colson. Robinson played Colson's attorney and Dean Jones starred as Colson. During 1974, he played the museum director in a 1975 episode of the ABC supernatural show Kolchak: The Night Stalker titled "Chopper" and a dual role in a Banacek mystery called "Now You See Him, Now You Don't." In 1977, he appeared in the final episode of the situation comedy The Kallikaks. In 1982, he appeared in Partners with Ryan O'Neal and John Hurt. 

Before retiring, Robinson was the host and narrator for the Discovery Channel special (and later documentary series) Beyond Bizarre from 1997 to 2000.

Personal life
At age 23, his newfound celebrity, after appearing in The Robe and its sequel Demetrius and the Gladiators, reportedly inflated his ego and he became extremely difficult to work with.

In addition, the volatile actor began experimenting recklessly with drugs. He was arrested and booked in 1958 for possession of narcotics (methadone). After a trial, he was sentenced to a year in jail, but his conviction was overturned on appeal. Although he was free on bail, the incident and resulting bad publicity ruined his acting career for almost a decade.

After finding work outside the entertainment industry as a cook and landlord, he recovered from his drug addiction and eventually married.

Resuming acting work in obscure bit parts, he had another career relapse when he was forced to spend 15 months in jail after all for an old warrant served on him for unknowingly missing a court date during his earlier retrial. Robinson credited letters of encouragement from friend Bette Davis with helping him find the strength to overcome his problems. She helped him get his first film role in 13 years in 1971's Bunny O'Hare.

Robinson was married twice: to Pauline Flowers from 1960 until her death in 2002 and to Gloria Casas from 2004 until his death. He had one son with Flowers.

Filmography

The Robe (1953) – Caligula
Demetrius and the Gladiators (1954) – Caligula
The Virgin Queen (1955) – Chadwick
The Wild Party (1956) – Gage Freeposter
My Man Godfrey (1957) – Vincent
Tell Me in the Sunlight (1965) – Barber
Bunny O'Hare (1971) – John C. Rupert
Everything You Always Wanted to Know About Sex* (*But Were Afraid to Ask) (1972) – The Priest
This Is a Hijack (1973) – Simon Scott
Three the Hard Way (1974) – Monroe Feather
Nightmare Honeymoon (1974) – Ruskin
Shampoo (1975) – Norman
Train Ride to Hollywood (1975) – Dracula
I Wonder Who's Killing Her Now? (1975) – Insane Actor
Born Again (1978) – David Shapiro
The Man with Bogart's Face (1980) – Wolf / Zinderneuf
Partners (1982) – Halderstam
The Sword and the Sorcerer (1982) – King Charles
The Malibu Bikini Shop (1986) – Ben
Big Top Pee-wee (1988) – Cook
Transylvania Twist (1989) – Uncle Ephram
Bram Stoker's Dracula (1992) – Mr. Hawkins
Ghost Ship (1992) – Crusoe – pirate
Skeeter (1993) – Drake

References

External links

 
  
 

1930 births
2013 deaths
20th-century American male actors
American male film actors
American male television actors
Burials at Forest Lawn Memorial Park (Hollywood Hills)
Male actors from New York City